"Ordinary World" is a song by English rock band Duran Duran, released in December 1992 as the first single from their self-titled album (1993), commonly known as The Wedding Album. The ballad reached  1 on the US Billboard Mainstream Top 40, the Canadian RPM Top Singles chart, and the Italian Singles Chart. It also peaked at No. 3 on the Billboard Hot 100, No. 2 in Iceland and Sweden, and No. 6 on the UK Singles Chart.

The song was nominated for Ivor Novello Award for Best Song Musically and Lyrically in May 1994. Lead vocalist Simon Le Bon sang the song with Luciano Pavarotti at a benefit concert for War Child. "Ordinary World" remains one of Duran Duran's most popular songs and in October 2021, was their second-most streamed song in the UK.

Background
By the early 1990s, Duran Duran's popularity had faded. Their album Liberty had proved a commercial failure, its two singles failing to make a significant showing on the British or American charts. It was not until Capitol Records leaked "Ordinary World" to a radio station in Jacksonville, Florida during the second half of 1992 that it seemed like Duran Duran would find a resurgence in popularity. To their surprise, the single proved so popular that Capitol had to push the US release date up, ultimately releasing it in December. In the United Kingdom, the song was released on 18 January 1993.

The keyboards in the song were arranged and performed by Nick Rhodes and John Jones. The drums were played by Steve Ferrone at Maison Rouge. The guitar solo that characterises this song was arranged and performed by Warren Cuccurullo, former player with Frank Zappa. His instrumental rock trio version became a staple of his solo shows and was included on one of his solo albums "Roadrage". Le Bon noted the song lyrics are about "trying to get over the death of a best friend. And putting it into words freed me, absolutely. It really worked for me emotionally and mentally. Everyone who heard it could apply it to something in their life, but for a different reason."

Le Bon later performed the song with Luciano Pavarotti at a WarChild benefit. The performance featured new lyrics in Italian, written especially for the show by producer Michele Centonze, most of which were a very free adaptation (rather than a translation) of Le Bon's original lyrics; the title "Ordinary World" was rendered as "mondo umile", i.e. humble world. The duet, along with the whole show, was released on home video as Pavarotti & Friends: Together for the Children of Bosnia. Later on, in an interview featured on the DVD release of the show, Le Bon stated that he loved singing in Italian because of the very open vowel sounds in the language.

The lyrics to "Ordinary World" were written by Le Bon as the second of a trilogy of songs for his late friend David Miles; the others being "Do You Believe in Shame?" (1988) and "Out of My Mind" (1997).

Critical reception
In a retrospective review of "Ordinary World", AllMusic journalist Donald A. Guarisco praised the song for having what he described as "a warm ballad feel, matching elegant verses full of entrancing repeating-note hooks with a rousing chorus built on soaring runs of ascending notes." Guarisco described Simon Le Bon's vocal as being "rich in emotion but tastefully restrained". Upon the release, J.D. Considine from The Baltimore Sun said the success of "Ordinary World" "is nothing short of miraculous who'd have thought these pretty boys would still be producing memorable singles at this stage of the game?" The Independent praised it as "a classic of transcendent beauty". Tony Fletcher for Newsday stated that the "excellently crafted" ballad shows the group "to be capable of delivering the goods. And as an added irony for a band that was introduced by MTV when radio wouldn't touch it, this particular song exploded across radio's many formats before a video was even made." Ann Powers from New York Times declared it as "a smooth yet pathos-ridden ballad". Sam Wood from Philadelphia Inquirer called it a "sober ballad". Andrea Odintz from Rolling Stone felt the "dreamy" song "achieves the almost spiritual effects" of Duran Duran's 1982 hit "Save a Prayer". Peter Howell from Toronto Star remarked that the "ethereal" debut single "has all the earmarks of an unstoppable radio hit". Mark Jenkins from The Washington Post found that such ballads as "Ordinary World" "achieve melodic sufficiency."

Music video
The accompanying music video for "Ordinary World" was directed by Nick Egan at Huntington Gardens in San Marino, California, and the song later featured in the soundtrack to the film Layer Cake in 2004.

Live versions
"Ordinary World" is one of two Cuccurullo-era songs ("Come Undone" being the other) during Duran Duran's reunion tour with Andy Taylor and Roger Taylor. Cuccurullo was brought in to teach Andy Taylor how to play it.

B-sides, bonus tracks and remixes
"My Antarctica", a song from the band's previous album Liberty, featured as the main B-side of the "Ordinary World" single.

Many other older singles were also used as B-sides. To capitalise on the success of "Ordinary World" and the new Duran Duran fans it was finding, EMI used the single's release to lure these new fans to the band's back catalogue. This mini-Decade was spread over the two CD singles released during the campaign.

Other mixes
There were several other versions of "Ordinary World" released: 
 The "Single Version" or "Single Mix" was a differently mixed and edited version, sent to radio stations, used for the promotional video, and available on the CD single release in certain countries outside the US.
 The "Acoustic Version" was more correctly the "Acoustic Mix" and was created using the studio guitar & vocal tracks and adding specially arranged string orchestration. An alternative live acoustic performance was recorded at the 15 May "No Ordinary Tour" live performance at Tower Records in Hollywood, which was simulcast to Hard Rock Cafés around the world. This live version was found on a number of "Ordinary World" releases outside the UK, most notably the Canadian and American cassette single and featured additional musicians, Gerry L and AD'A. It would eventually be released in the UK on the first CD single for "Come Undone".
 The "AC Edit" was featured on a US promo CD that came packaged with the Decade album.
 A live version recorded on Simon Mayo's Radio 1 show featured as a B-side to the band's later 1995 single "White Lines". 
 An extended version recorded at Sony Studios in New York City for Hard Rock Live was included on a promotional 2-track CD in June 2000 by the band's new label Hollywood Records, running at 6:08.
 Live version released on From Mediterranea with Love, a promotional EP digital release in December 2010.

Track listings

 UK 7-inch and cassette single
 "Ordinary World" (single version) – 4:41
 "My Antarctica" – 5:06

 UK CD1
 "Ordinary World" (single version)
 "Save a Prayer"
 "Skin Trade"
 "My Antarctica"

 UK CD2
 "Ordinary World" (single version)
 "The Reflex"
 "Hungry Like the Wolf"
 "Girls on Film"

 US CD single
 "Ordinary World" – 5:39
 "My Antarctica" – 5:06
 "Save a Prayer" – 5:33
 "UMF" – 5:31

 US and Canadian cassette single
 "Ordinary World" – 5:39
 "Ordinary World" (acoustic version) – 5:05
 "Save a Prayer ('Til the Morning After)" (live) – 6:12

 Australian CD single
 "Ordinary World" (single version) – 4:41
 "My Antarctica" – 5:06
 "Save a Prayer" – 5:33
 "The Reflex" – 4:25

 The Singles 1986–1995 box set
 "Ordinary World" (single version) – 4:43
 "My Antarctica" – 5:00
 "Ordinary World" – 5:39
 "Save a Prayer" (single version) – 5:25
 "Skin Trade" – 4:25
 "The Reflex" (7-inch version) – 4:25
 "Hungry Like the Wolf" – 3:25
 "Girls on Film" – 3:30

Personnel
 Simon Le Bon – lead vocals
 John Taylor – bass guitars
 Nick Rhodes – keyboards
 Warren Cuccurullo – acoustic and electric guitars
 John Jones – keyboards
 Steve Ferrone – drums

Charts

Weekly charts

Year-end charts

Certifications

Release history

Aurora version

British Electronic music group Aurora released a trance version of "Ordinary World" featuring Irish singer-songwriter Naimee Coleman in 2000. This version, released on 11 September that year, charted at No. 5 in the United Kingdom, No. 6 in Ireland, and No. 47 in Germany. In the United States, it appeared on the Billboard Hot Dance Club Play chart, peaking at No. 37 in June 2001.

Track listings
 UK CD and cassette single
 "Ordinary World" (radio edit) – 4:26
 "Ordinary World" (Above & Beyond remix) – 8:25
 "Hear You Calling" (Dark Moon remix) – 6:23

 UK 12-inch single
A1. "Ordinary World" (Condor remix edit) – 8:01
AA1. "Ordinary World" (Above & Beyond remix edit) – 6:45
AA2. "Ordinary World" (Gizeh remix edit) – 4:54

 European CD single
 "Ordinary World" (radio edit) – 4:26
 "Ordinary World" (Condor remix) – 9:08

 German maxi-CD single
 "Ordinary World" (original radio mix) – 4:24
 "Ordinary World" (Floorfilla radio cut) – 3:47
 "Ordinary World" (club mix) – 9:06
 "Ordinary World" (Floorfilla remix) – 6:50
 "Ordinary World" (Gizeh mix) – 7:01
 "Ordinary World" (DJ Janis vs. Plus One remix) – 8:04

 Australian CD single
 "Ordinary World" (radio edit) – 4:26
 "Ordinary World" (extended mix) – 8:16
 "Ordinary World" (Condor remix) – 9:08
 "Ordinary World" (Above & Beyond remix) – 8:25
 "Hear You Calling" (Dark Moon remix) – 6:23

Charts

References

1990s ballads
1992 songs
1992 singles
1993 singles
2000 singles
Aurora (electronica band) songs
British soft rock songs
Capitol Records singles
Duran Duran songs
East West Records singles
EMI Records singles
Parlophone singles
Positiva Records singles
Number-one singles in Italy
Rock ballads
RPM Top Singles number-one singles
Songs written by John Taylor (bass guitarist)
Songs written by Nick Rhodes
Songs written by Simon Le Bon
Songs written by Warren Cuccurullo
Commemoration songs
Trance songs